HMS Labuan (K584), ex-Gold Coast, was a  of the United Kingdom which served in the Royal Navy during World War II. She was originally ordered by the United States Navy as the Tacoma-class patrol frigate USS Harvey (PF-80) and briefly renamed Gold Coast before she was transferred to the Royal Navy prior to completion.

Construction and acquisition
The ship, originally designated a "patrol gunboat," PG-188, was ordered by the United States Maritime Commission under a United States Navy contract as USS Harvey. She was reclassified as a "patrol frigate," PF-80, on 15 April 1943 and laid down by the Walsh-Kaiser Company at Providence, Rhode Island, on 7 August 1943. Intended for transfer to the United Kingdom, the ship was renamed Gold Coast and then again renamed Labuan by the British prior to launching. She was launched on 21 September 1943.

Service history
Transferred to the United Kingdom under Lend-Lease on 5 February 1944, the ship served in the Royal Navy as HMS Labuan (pennant K584) on patrol and escort duty in the English Channel.

The United Kingdom returned Labuan to the U.S. Navy on 13 May 1946. She was sold to the Heggie Iron and Metal Company of Dorchester, Massachusetts, on 9 July 1957 for scrapping.

References 

NavSource Online: Frigate Photo Archive: HMS Labuan (K 584) ex-Gold Coast ex-Harvey ex-PF-80 ex-PG-187

Tacoma-class frigates
Ships built in Providence, Rhode Island
1943 ships
World War II frigates and destroyer escorts of the United States
Colony-class frigates
World War II frigates of the United Kingdom